Pfingsten is an unincorporated community in Nobles County, Minnesota, United States.

Notes

Unincorporated communities in Nobles County, Minnesota
Unincorporated communities in Minnesota